The Krasnoyarsk Dam is a  high concrete gravity dam located on the Yenisey River about  upstream from Krasnoyarsk in Divnogorsk, Russia. It was constructed from 1956 to 1972, and it supplies about 6,000 MW of electricity, mostly used to supply the KrAZ (Krasnoyarsky Aluminievyy Zavod, the Krasnoyarsk Aluminum Plant). Both power and aluminum plants are controlled by the RUSAL company.

Beginning with the opening of the 10th turbine in April 1971, the powerhouse was the world's single largest power plant until the Grand Coulee Dam in Washington state reached 6,181 MW in 1983. The Krasnoyarsk Dam is held to be a landmark symbol of Krasnoyarsk, and it is depicted on the 10-ruble banknote.

As a result of the damming, the Krasnoyarsk Reservoir was created.

In winter, the frigid air interacts with the warm river water to produce fog, which shrouds Krasnoyarsk and other downstream areas.

Ship lift 

The dam is equipped with a canal inclined plane to allow passage of ships. It is in fact an electric rack railway. At the time of its construction, this feat of modern engineering allowed for ships to be physically moved in only 90 minutes.

See also 

 List of power stations in Russia

References

External links 

 Yenisey River Steam Navigation  - photo gallery showing ship elevator
 Single Russian shiplift/Единственный в России судоподъемник - Video of the ship elevator in operation

Hydroelectric power stations built in the Soviet Union
Hydroelectric power stations in Russia
Buildings and structures in Krasnoyarsk Krai
Dams completed in 1972
Dams on the Yenisei River
Broad gauge railways by size